Underwoodia iuloides is a species of millipede in the family Caseyidae. It is found in North America.

References

Further reading

 

Chordeumatida
Articles created by Qbugbot
Millipedes of North America
Animals described in 1872